Havulinna is a Finnish surname. Notable people with the surname include:

Matti Havulinna (1931–2012), Finnish sprint canoer
Kalle Havulinna (1924–2016), Finnish professional ice hockey player 

Finnish-language surnames